Greatest Hits (sometimes referred to as Kenny Rogers' Greatest Hits) is the second compilation album by country music superstar Kenny Rogers. It was released in September 1980 and issued by Liberty Records. The album marks Rogers' first release after United Artists Group merged with Liberty. The album has achieved diamond certification.

History
The album reached No. 1 on both the Pop and Country charts in the US and featured three singles that were not included on any of Rogers' studio albums - these being "Lady" (written and produced specifically for Rogers by Lionel Richie, which was a No. 1 hit single in the same year), "Love The World Away" (a top five country and top 20 pop hit that was featured on the soundtrack of the box-office smash Urban Cowboy) and "Long Arm of the Law" (a lesser known, but still relatively popular song among Rogers' loyal fan base).

The album features a further nine hit singles from Rogers' career, hence missing out on a number of others (notable omissions including "Daytime Friends", "Sweet Music Man" and "Love or Something Like It") but didn't stop the album from being a huge success and confirmed Rogers' status as one of the world's biggest stars, going on to sell more than 24 million copies worldwide . In country music today it remains the best selling compilation release of all time, beating out Garth Brooks' 1994 limited-time-availability release The Hits.

In the UK the album was sold with the same artwork under the title Lady but differed slightly in the track listing, omitting "Ruby, Don't Take Your Love to Town" and "Reuben James" in favor of "Goodbye Marie" and "Sail Away".

As it happens, this is not the only Kenny Rogers album to be called Greatest Hits. In 1971, while with The First Edition, an album under that title was released. Since 1980 many other collections by Rogers have been called Greatest Hits, such as a 1985 Reader's Digest box set and the 1988 collection of his RCA material. However, this 1980 collection on Liberty was the first solo offering by Rogers to be given this designation.

In 1983, when Rogers changed labels to RCA Records, Liberty quickly issued 20 Greatest Hits, a more complete overall look at Rogers' hit list. However, both albums remained in catalog side by side for over two decades. Also in 1983, HBO re-released the Greatest Hits package on special picture discs. The track listing remained identical to the 1980 US release.

Track listings

US Great Hits release / UK release (Lady)

Chart performance

Weekly charts

Year-end charts

Certifications

See also
List of best-selling albums in the United States

References 

1980 greatest hits albums
Kenny Rogers compilation albums
Liberty Records compilation albums
Albums produced by Richard Landis